Mason Kendle Spence (born 21 November 1994) is a footballer who plays as a full-back for Kempston Rovers. Born in England, he made one appearance for the U19 national team.

Club career

Milton Keynes Dons
Born in Milton Keynes, Spence started his career in the youth team of local club Milton Keynes Dons where he was captain, signing his first professional contract in May 2011. He made his professional debut on 4 September 2012, in a 1–0 defeat to Northampton Town in the Football League Trophy. In April 2013, Spence was released by the club after making just one first team appearance.

Colchester United
Spence joined Colchester United's Academy, initially on trial at the end of the 2012–13 season, playing in a number of under-21 games for the club. He then signed a one-year contract in June 2013. He made his U's and Football League debut as a substitute for Ryan Dickson after just 20 minutes of an injury-ravaged Colchester's 2–0 defeat to Coventry City on 8 September.

On 14 January 2014, Spence joined Conference South side Concord Rangers on a one-month loan deal, making his debut as a 30th-minute substitute for Jack Lampe in the side's 2–1 victory over table-topping Bromley and providing the assist for Rangers' second goal.

St Neots Town
On 26 March 2014, Spence joined Southern Football League side St Neots Town after having his contract cancelled by mutual consent at Colchester United.

International career

Eligible to represent Wales, Spence featured for the Wales U19 team during the 2012–13 season. He made his national youth-team debut on 12 October 2012 in a 2–1 win against Slovenia, coming on as an 89th-minute substitute.

Career statistics

References

External links

Mason Spence at Aylesbury United

1994 births
Living people
People from Milton Keynes
Association football fullbacks
English people of Welsh descent
English footballers
Welsh footballers
Wales youth international footballers
Milton Keynes Dons F.C. players
Colchester United F.C. players
Concord Rangers F.C. players
St Neots Town F.C. players
Stony Stratford Town F.C. players
Hayes & Yeading United F.C. players
Chelmsford City F.C. players
Dunstable Town F.C. players
Hitchin Town F.C. players
English Football League players
National League (English football) players
Footballers from Buckinghamshire